La fée printemps (English: The Spring Fairy) is a 1902 French short film directed by Ferdinand Zecca.

The film depicts a couple that offers a meal to an old woman. She then becomes a fairy that converts winter into spring.

The film has been stencil-colorized by Segundo de Chomón.

See also 
 List of French films before 1910

External links

References 

1902 films
French short films
French silent short films
Films directed by Ferdinand Zecca
Articles containing video clips
1900s French films